Saxham & Risby railway station was a station serving Risby in the English county of Suffolk. It was opened by the Great Eastern Railway in 1854 following the line's extension from Newmarket to Bury St Edmunds. It was not particularly near either of the places it served, with Risby being about a mile to the north and Saxham a couple of mile to the south. Its main purpose was to serve agriculture in mid-Suffolk.

At its peak during the period 1860 to 1890 there was a station master and three other members of staff. From 1929 onwards the four station staff were replaced by a 'Porter-in-charge' until its closure in 1967. Freight services ceased several years earlier, on 28 December 1964, along with other stations along the line. After closure, the south platform and waiting room was removed in 1970, whilst the north platform and the main station building remained derelict until it was demolished in the late 1980s.

Today, only a small part of the north platform remains alongside the station car park. A railway terrace house still stands along Station Avenue and has been converted to private residence, however most of the surrounding area has been transformed into an agricultural industrial estate.

According to the Official Handbook of Stations the following classes of traffic were being handled at this station in 1956: G,  P, F, L, H, C. and there was no crane. Calor Gas had a private siding there.

References

External links
 Saxham & Risby station on navigable 1946 O.S. map
 Local history of Saxham and Risby
 External pictures of Saxham and Risby station in 1975

Disused railway stations in Suffolk
Former Great Eastern Railway stations
Railway stations in Great Britain opened in 1854
Railway stations in Great Britain closed in 1967